Spilarctia xanthosoma is a moth in the family Erebidae. It was described by Walter Karl Johann Roepke in 1954. It is found on Java.

References

Moths described in 1954
xanthosoma